Clay Charles Helton (born June 24, 1972) is an American college football coach and former player, who is currently the head coach at Georgia Southern. He was previously the head coach of USC from 2015 to 2021. Helton has also been an assistant coach for Duke, Houston and Memphis. His father, Kim Helton, was a coach in college, the National Football League, and the Canadian Football League.

Early life
Helton was born on June 24, 1972, in Gainesville, Florida, where his father Kim Helton, was a graduate assistant for the Florida Gators football team. The Helton family later lived in  the Miami, Tampa Bay, and Houston areas, as Kim Helton later coached for the University of Miami, Tampa Bay Buccaneers, and Houston Oilers. Clay Helton attended Clements High School in Sugar Land, Texas and graduated in 1990.

College playing career
After redshirting his freshman year, Helton played college football at Auburn as quarterback. In 1993, Helton transferred to Houston, after his father was hired as head coach there. Helton was a backup quarterback at both Auburn and Houston and graduated from Houston in 1994 with a degree in mathematics and interdisciplinary science. At Houston, Helton completed 47 of 87 passes for 420 yards, one touchdown, and four interceptions and played 16 games.

Coaching career
In 1995, Helton enrolled at Duke University and became a graduate assistant for the Duke Blue Devils football team under Fred Goldsmith. Helton later was promoted as running backs coach in 1996.

Helton joined his father at Houston to be running backs coach in 1997 and remained in that position until 1999, Kim Helton's final season as head coach.

After leaving Houston, Helton joined Rip Scherer's staff at Memphis also as running backs coach. Helton stayed on staff under new coach Tommy West, who replaced Scherer in 2001, and moved to coaching the wide receivers in 2003. By 2007, Helton was promoted to offensive coordinator and quarterbacks coach. Players Helton coached at Memphis include DeAngelo Williams, a first-round NFL draft pick in 2005, and 2006 Conference USA All-Freshman pick Duke Calhoun.

USC 
Helton was hired by USC to be quarterbacks coach in 2010 under Lane Kiffin. In 2013, he was promoted to offensive coordinator. Helton served as the team's interim head coach during their bowl game after their previous interim head coach, Ed Orgeron, resigned following the hiring of Steve Sarkisian. On October 11, 2015, he once again became the interim head coach of the Trojans after head coach Steve Sarkisian took a leave of absence, and was then subsequently fired. On November 30, 2015, USC removed the interim tag and formally named Helton the 23rd head coach in school history. After Helton was named the permanent head coach, USC lost its final two games of the 2015 season to Stanford in the Pac-12 championship game and Wisconsin in the Holiday Bowl.  In Helton's first full season as head coach, USC started off 1–3 with losses to Alabama, Stanford, and Utah, but then won its final eight games of the 2016 regular season as well as the Rose Bowl against Penn State to end the season with a record of 10–3 and third place in the AP poll.

In Helton's last full season as head coach, the season was shortened due to the COVID-19 pandemic. USC ended with a 5–1 record, with the only loss to Oregon in the Pac-12 championship game.

On September 13, 2021, Helton was relieved of his duties at USC after a loss to Stanford. His buyout was in the $12 million range. Including two stints as the interim head coach, Helton's record was 46-24 as the Trojans' coach, including a Rose Bowl win to cap the 2016 season. USC went 1-1 under Helton in the 2021–22 season.

Georgia Southern 
On November 2, 2021, Helton was announced as the 11th head coach for Georgia Southern, replacing interim head coach Kevin Whitley.

Head coaching record

Notes

References

External links

 Georgia Southern profile
 USC profile
 Memphis profile
 Houston profile

1972 births
Living people
American football quarterbacks
Auburn Tigers football players
Duke Blue Devils football coaches
Georgia Southern Eagles football coaches
Houston Cougars football coaches
Memphis Tigers football coaches
Houston Cougars football players
USC Trojans football coaches
Duke University alumni
People from Gainesville, Florida
People from Sugar Land, Texas
Coaches of American football from Texas
Players of American football from Texas